Analyze This is a 1999 American mafia comedy film directed by Harold Ramis, who co-wrote the screenplay with playwright Kenneth Lonergan, and Peter Tolan. The plot follows a crisis-stricken mafioso (Robert De Niro) who solicits the assistance of a reluctant psychiatrist (Billy Crystal).

Analyze This was given a wide release by Warner Bros. Pictures and Roadshow Entertainment on March 5, 1999, grossing $176.9 million worldwide, and received positive reviews. Due to its success, it was followed by the sequel Analyze That in 2002.

Plot
Mob boss Paul Vitti and his consigliere Manetta are discussing an upcoming meeting and the Mafia's present-day problems over lunch. Just as Manetta warns Paul to look out for Primo Sindone (an up-and-coming mafioso who wants to be capo di tutti capi), gunmen drive past and kill Manetta. Paul narrowly escapes.

Psychiatrist Ben Sobel is stressed: his son from his first marriage spies on his sessions, his patients are not challenging enough, and his wedding to Laura MacNamara is upcoming. Ben rear-ends a car belonging to Paul and the trunk opens, revealing a man bound and gagged inside, which Ben and his son do not notice. Jelly, one of Paul's men, takes the blame, but Ben gives Jelly his business card in case he changes his mind regarding compensation.

During a meeting, Paul has a panic attack and tells Jelly that he needs to see a psychiatrist, but it has to be kept a secret, and Jelly recommends Ben. Paul visits Ben, claiming his friend needs therapy, but Ben sees through the lie. As he realizes Paul is talking about himself, it impresses Paul enough to want to see him constantly, to Ben's frustration. Ben goes to Miami for his wedding and Paul, Jelly, and the crew follow. Paul explains he has been suffering from erectile dysfunction and Ben suggests the source of the problem might be stress.

The next day, Paul has another panic attack and requests to see Ben. Paul explains his history with his father to him, who thinks this might have something to do with Paul's anxiety. The wedding is interrupted when an assassin is killed by Jelly. Ben confronts Paul and causes him to lose his temper. Ben suggests he resolve his anger by calling Primo and telling him how he feels. Paul phones Primo and starts doing it, but ends up threatening to kill him.

Ben and his family return to New York, where they find a fountain in their garden, a gift from Paul. The FBI arrive and request Ben inform on Paul, but he refuses despite the FBI's threats. He changes his mind when the FBI play a tape in which Paul reveals his intention to kill Ben after the meeting (which the FBI had altered: Paul was actually saying he would kill anyone who threatened Ben). 

At his next meet-up with Paul, Ben wears a wire, but discards it when he learns that, as a child, he witnessed his father being murdered. Paul, informed that Ben was working with the FBI, takes him to a secluded place to kill him. They get into a heated argument, and Paul breaks down as he admits that he blames himself for his father's death. Just then, two hitmen arrive to kill Paul, but Jelly kills them both. Paul apologizes for planning to kill Ben, and the two part ways.

The day of the meeting arrives, but Paul has a severe panic attack. Jelly interrupts Ben's wedding, requesting Ben attend the meeting as Paul's consigliere. He is reluctant, but his ego causes him to patronize Primo until he finally pulls a gun. Paul arrives, orders Primo to stand down, and announces he knows a traitor in his own family killed Dominic, but will not seek revenge as he instead will retire from the Mafia. Outside, a standoff ensues between Paul's and Primo's men, during which Ben sacrifices himself for Paul. The FBI intervenes, the mobsters are arrested, and Ben is taken to the hospital.

Ben visits Paul in prison, and Paul thanks Ben for his help before informing him that Primo is dead. At home, Ben dances with his new wife as Tony Bennett serenades them.

Cast

Production

Development
Analyze This was co-produced and co-financed by the American Warner Bros. and the Australian Roadshow Entertainment.

Reception

Box office
Analyze This opened in 2,518 theaters and earned an average of $7,017 per location, for an estimated $18 million opening, putting it at number 1 at the box office for that weekend; it exceeded the $13 million debut of Crystal's City Slickers in 1991. It would also break Ronins record for having the largest opening weekend for a Robert De Niro film. The film held this record until the release of Meet the Parents in October 2000. The opening weekend audience skewed older, with 75% over the age of 25, and audience demographics being 54% female to 46% male. The film went on to earn $107 million at the domestic box office and a further $70 million at the international box office, for a worldwide total of $177 million.

Critical response
On review aggregation website Rotten Tomatoes the film has an approval rating of 69% from 107 reviews, with an average rating of 6.50/10. The website's consensus states, "Analyze This is a satisfying comedy with great performances by De Niro and Crystal." On Metacritic the film has a weighted average score of 61 out of 100 based on 30 reviews, indicating "generally favorable reviews." Audiences polled by CinemaScore gave the film a grade of "A-."

Roger Ebert gave the film 3 out of 4 stars, saying the film would be thought of in terms of the two leads, but also praised Joe Viterelli for his subtle performance that holds the film together.

Analyze This drew several comparisons by journalists to the mafia show The Sopranos, which had premiered two months earlier in January, due to its plot about mobster Tony Soprano seeing a psychiatrist. The movie is also mentioned in The Sopranos episode "Guy Walks into a Psychiatrist's Office..."

References

External links

 
 
 

1999 films
1999 comedy films
1990s crime comedy films
American crime comedy films
1990s English-language films
Films about murderers
Films about psychiatry
Films directed by Harold Ramis
Films set in Miami
Films set in New York City
Films shot in Miami
Films shot in New Jersey
Films shot in New York City
American black comedy films
Mafia comedy films
Films with screenplays by Harold Ramis
Village Roadshow Pictures films
Warner Bros. films
Films with screenplays by Kenneth Lonergan
Films with screenplays by Peter Tolan
Films scored by Howard Shore
1990s American films
Films about the American Mafia